Ewelina Tobiasz (born ) is a Polish volleyball player. She is part of the Poland women's national volleyball team.

She participated in the 2015 FIVB Volleyball World Grand Prix, and in the 2016 FIVB Volleyball World Grand Prix.

On club level she played for Budowlani Łódź

References

External links

1994 births
Living people
Polish women's volleyball players
Place of birth missing (living people)